An Old-Fashioned Girl is a 1949 American musical comedy film based on the novel of the same name by Louisa May Alcott, directed by Arthur Dreifuss and starring Gloria Jean.

Jean had just made two films for Dreifuss at Columbia, then signed to do two more for the director. It was made by Vinson Productions for Eagle-Lion.

Filming started 20 September 1948.

Cast

 Gloria Jean as Polly Milton
 Jimmy Lydon as Tom Shaw
 John Hubbard as Mr. Sydney
 Frances Rafferty as Frances Shaw
 Mary Eleanor Donahue as Maud Shaw
 Irene Ryan as Mrs. Shaw
 Douglas Wood as Mr. Shaw
 Barbara Brier as Trix Parker
 Claire Whitney as Miss Mills
 Rosemary LaPlanche as Emma Davenport
 Quenna Norla as Miss Perkins
 Shirley Mills as Belle
 Saundra Berkova as Irma
 Milton Kibbee as Farmer Brown

References

External links
An Old Fashioned Girl at IMDb
An Old Fashioned Girl at Letterbox
Complete movie

1949 films
1949 musical comedy films
American black-and-white films
American musical comedy films
Eagle-Lion Films films
Films based on American novels
Films based on works by Louisa May Alcott
Films directed by Arthur Dreifuss
1940s English-language films
1940s American films